The NHL on NBC is an American presentation of National Hockey League (NHL) games produced by NBC Sports, and televised on NBC properties, including MSNBC, CNBC, Golf Channel, USA Network and NBCSN in the United States.

While NBC covered the league at various points in its history, the network's last relationship with the NHL is the result of NBC Sports acquiring the league's broadcast television rights from ABC in 2005. Its most recent contract with the league ran until the end of the 2020–21 NHL season; NHL broadcasting rights onward have been acquired by ABC/ESPN and Turner Sports (now known as Warner Bros. Discovery Sports). Though the main NBC network no longer airs NHL games, NBC Sports Regional Networks currently airs some games in the form of game telecasts that air on a regional basis, featuring local NHL franchises that each of the regional networks have respective broadcast rights to air in their designated market.

From 2008 until the end of the NHL on NBC in 2021, NBC's regular season coverage included the annual NHL Winter Classic, an outdoor game usually played on New Year's Day; one national weekly regular season game each Sunday afternoon after New Year's Day; one week of nationally televised contests in February for Hockey Day in America; and one nationally televised game one day after Thanksgiving. NBCSN's coverage included 90 regular season games that were mostly aired on Monday, Tuesday, and Wednesday evenings, and later in the season on Sunday nights. Coverage of the Stanley Cup Playoffs was split between NBC and NBCSN, with CNBC and the USA Network (beginning in 2015) airing selected playoff games during the first two rounds.

History

February 25, 1940 and 1966
As part of a series of experimental broadcasts that W2XBS (now NBC's flagship station, WNBC) produced between 1939 and 1940, the station broadcast a game between the New York Rangers and Montreal Canadiens from Madison Square Garden on February 25, 1940.  Bill Allen provided the commentary. About 300 people in the New York City area saw the Rangers win, 6–2. Over the next few years, W2XBS (later WNBT) carried some New York Rangers home games on a local basis. A few New York Americans and Rangers games were on experimental TV stations in 1940-41 and 1941-42; then TV closed down until 1945-46.

Regularly scheduled American network broadcasts of NHL games would not begin until the late 1950s, when CBS began carrying regular season games, but no playoff games. The deal was terminated in 1960, due to a combination of a dispute over the players receiving a share of the rights fee and the then-regional nature of the sport.

Nationally televised NHL games in the United States resumed for the 1965–66 NHL season, but this time on NBC; the regional issues were settled by the league's pending addition of six new teams, which expanded the league's reach nationwide and into lucrative markets in Pennsylvania and California (in addition to two other midwestern markets; NBC, however, would lose the broadcast rights before the six new teams would make it to play). In 1966, NBC became the first television network in the United States to air a national broadcast of a Stanley Cup Playoff game. The network provided coverage of four Sunday afternoon playoff games during the  postseason. On April 10 and April 17, NBC aired semifinal games between the Chicago Black Hawks and the Detroit Red Wings. On April 24 and May 1, NBC aired Games 1 and 4 of the Stanley Cup Finals between the Montreal Canadiens and the Detroit Red Wings. Win Elliot served as the play-by-play man while Bill Mazer served as the color commentator for the games.

NBC's coverage of the 1966 Stanley Cup Finals marked the first time that hockey games were broadcast on network television in color. The CBC would follow suit the following year. NBC's Stanley Cup coverage preempted a sports anthology series called NBC Sports in Action, hosted by Jim Simpson and Bill Cullen, who were between-periods co-hosts for the Stanley Cup broadcasts.

NHL broadcast rights returned to CBS the next season, however due to other programming commitments, regular season games were handed off to RKO General.

1970s
From –, NBC not only televised the Stanley Cup Finals (including a couple of games in prime time), but also weekly regular season games on Sunday afternoons. The previous contract with CBS was paying the NHL less than $2 million a year and NBC jumped in with an offer of $5.3 million. NBC also aired one regular season and a couple of playoff games in prime time during the first couple of seasons. Tim Ryan and Ted Lindsay (with Brian McFarlane as the intermission host) served as the commentators for NBC's NHL coverage during this period. Since most NHL teams still did not have players' names displayed on the backs of jerseys, NBC persuaded NHL commissioner Clarence Campbell to make teams put on players' names on NBC telecasts beginning with the  season to help viewers identify them.

Peter Puck was introduced during NBC's NHL coverage in the 1970s. The animated character, whose cartoon adventures (produced by Hanna-Barbera) appeared on both NBC's Hockey Game of the Week and CBC's Hockey Night in Canada, explained hockey rules to the home viewing audience.

Besides Peter Puck, the 1970s version of The NHL on NBC had a between-periods feature titled Showdown. The concept of Showdown involved 20 of the NHL's greatest players (16 shooters and four goaltenders) going head-to-head in a taped penalty shot competition. After the NHL left NBC in 1975, Showdown continued to be seen on Hockey Night in Canada and local television broadcasts of U.S.-based NHL teams.

Schedules

1972–73

Note 
The December 29 and March 16 games were on Friday nights; all other regular season games were on Sunday afternoons. All start times at 3:00 p.m. Eastern Standard Time unless noted.

1973–74

Note 
The January 4 game was on a Friday night; all other regular season games were on Sunday afternoons. All start times were at 2:00 p.m. Eastern Time unless noted.

1974–75

Note 
All start times (with the exception of the January 19 and February 9 telecasts) were at 4:00 p.m. Eastern Time.

Stanley Cup playoffs

Stanley Cup Finals commentating crews

NBC did not broadcast the sixth game of the 1975 Finals, in which the Philadelphia Flyers defeated the Buffalo Sabres to clinch their second consecutive championship, played in prime time on a Tuesday night. Had the Finals gone to a seventh game, NBC would have pre-empted its prime time lineup on a Thursday night to carry that deciding contest. But by that time, the network had informed the NHL that unless ratings for the Finals spiked, it would drop the sport, which it did at the end of the season. In 1976, the NHL put together a syndication package that was carried in Chicago on WFLD.

Speaking of Chicago, WTTW carried the games of the 1974 and 1975 Stanley Cup Finals that weren't on NBC. The feed was syndicated by Hughes. WGN had picked it up in 1970 and 1972 (and originated Hawks road games in 1971 and 1973 unless CBS, then NBC, carried them), but passed in 1974 and 1975. In New York, the PBS station carried Game 5 of 1974 Finals at Boston and several of the games in 1975 that NBC did not have. While, Hughes provided the hookup, it took the visiting team announcers like Gene Hart and Don Earle from Boston for the Bruins-Flyers series, for instance.

The dark years (1976–1989)
For 17 years after the 1975 Finals, there would be no national over-the-air network coverage of the NHL in the United States (with the exception of CBS' coverage of Game 2 of the 1979 Challenge Cup and Game 6 of the 1980 Stanley Cup Finals and NBC's coverage of the NHL All-Star Game beginning in 1990) and only spotty coverage on local TV stations and regional sports networks in markets that had NHL clubs. This was due to the fact that no network was willing to commit to a large number of games, in turn, providing low ratings for NHL games. ABC would eventually resume broadcasting regular NHL games (on a time-buy basis through ESPN) for the 1992–93 season (and continuing through the 1993–94 season before Fox took over the broadcast television league rights for the next five seasons).

1990s
From 1990 through 1994, NBC only televised the All Star Game. NBC reportedly wanted to test the appeal of hockey, having recently lost the Major League Baseball package to CBS. Shortly thereafter however, NBC would gain the broadcast television rights to the National Basketball Association (NBA) from CBS, thus there was a bit of a notion that NBC no longer really needed hockey.

Marv Albert, and John Davidson called the action, while Mike Emrick served as an ice-level reporter in 1990. Meanwhile, Bill Clement served as an ice-level reporter in 1991, 1992 and 1994. Also, Hockey Night in Canadas Ron MacLean helped out with NBC's coverage of the 1993 All-Star Game, as would Brenda Brenon for the 1994 All-Star Game. In August 1989, The New York Times asked Marv Albert why had hockey lacked the popularity of other team sports in the United States. According to Albert, not many people have played hockey, and it was very difficult to capture as a televised sport. While Wayne Gretzky, playing for the Los Angeles Kings, had to help, there was according to Albert, also the impression that the owners encouraged fighting because they felt that the fans wanted it.

The Montreal Canadiens were slated to host the 1990 All-Star Game, but the team withdrew their bid to considerations due to the superb hosting by Quebec City of Rendez-vous '87. This had allowed the Pittsburgh Penguins, which wanted to host an All-Star Game in 1993, to move up three years early. For its part, Pittsburgh's organizers added much more to previous games, creating the first "true" All-Star weekend. Firstly was the addition of the Heroes of Hockey game, a two-period oldtimers' game between past NHL greats. The second was the addition of the National Hockey League All-Star Skills Competition, a competition between the players invited to the All-Star Game. All-Star players would be rewarded with US$2,500 for any win in the skills competition.

As previously mentioned, when NBC broadcast the 1990 NHL All-Star Game, it marked the first time that a National Hockey League game of any kind was aired on American network television, since CBS aired Game 6 of the 1980 Stanley Cup Finals. To accommodate the altered activities, the game itself was played on a Sunday afternoon instead of a Tuesday night, as was the case in previous years. This allowed NBC to air the game live across the United States – marking (surprisingly) the first time that a national audience would see Wayne Gretzky and Mario Lemieux play. Referees and other officials were also wired with microphones in this game, as were the two head coaches. Finally, NBC was also allowed to conduct interviews with players during stoppages in play, to the chagrin of the Hockey Night in Canada crew, whose attempts to do likewise were repeatedly denied by the league in previous years. NBC ultimately earned a 4.4 rating for the 1990 All-Star Game.

In 1991, NBC broke away from the telecast in the third period to televise a briefing from The Pentagon involving the Gulf War. SportsChannel America included the missing coverage in a replay of NBC's telecast (NBC owned 50% of Rainbow Enterprises, the parent of SportsChannel America).

There were reports about NBC making an arrangement to air four to eight regular season games for the  season but nothing materialized. More specifically, NHL officials had arranged a four-to eight-game, time-buy package on NBC, but that fell through when the NHL wanted assurance that all NBC affiliates would carry the games (by 2006, NBC had generally gotten all but a couple of affiliates in the Top-50 markets to carry the games). For instance, in 1990, NBC's affiliates in Atlanta (NBC's coverage of the 1992 All-Star Game aired on the independent station WTLK in that market), Charlotte, Memphis, New Orleans, Indianapolis and Phoenix did not clear the game (Atlanta and Phoenix would eventually receive NHL teams, however the Atlanta franchise relocated to Winnipeg in 2011). Ultimately, roughly 15% of the nation did not have access to the game. As previously mentioned, ABC became the league's network broadcaster instead, and then Fox won a bidding war with CBS for television rights lasting from the  through  seasons.

NBC's coverage of the 1993 All-Star Game drew a .450 rating in the males 18-34 bracket, the highest among sports shows this year and well above the NBA’s .350 average.

2000s

2002 Winter Olympics
In 2002, NBC broadcast the Winter Olympics from Salt Lake City, Utah. It marked the first time that NBC televised the Winter Olympics since the 1972 Games from Sapporo, Japan. For the men's hockey tournament, NBC enlisted ESPN/ABC’s Gary Thorne to call the games with color commentator John Davidson. The secondary announcing crew consisted of Fox’s Kenny Albert and ESPN/ABC’s Joe Micheletti. Albert also did play–by–play for the women's tournament alongside Lisa Brown-Miller. Meanwhile, ESPN/ABC’s Darren Pang served as ice-level reporter for both the men's and women's ice hockey tournaments. ESPN/ABC’s Bill Clement worked with Jim Lampley as a studio analyst during their coverage of both ice hockey tournaments.

Terms of the deal

In May 2004, NBC reached an agreement with the NHL to broadcast a slate of regular season games and the Stanley Cup Finals. The plan called for NBC to air at least six weeks of regular season games (three regional games each week) on Saturday afternoons. In addition, NBC was to show one or two playoff games per weekend during the playoffs. Between two and five games from the Stanley Cup Finals would air in prime time (OLN/Versus received the other two as part of its package). NBC's primary game each week, as well as the Stanley Cup Finals, would air in high definition.

Unlike previous network television deals with the NHL (like Fox, which had the rights from 1994 to 1999 and ABC, which had the rights from 1999 to 2004), NBC paid no upfront rights fee, instead splitting advertising revenue with the league after meeting its own production and distribution costs. On the other hand, the league avoided the arrangement some minor sports leagues have, in which they pay networks for broadcast time and produce their own telecasts, but keep any advertising revenue.

The last time NBC Sports entered a television deal which did not require it to pay any rights fees was in 1994–1995, when the division was involved in the Major League Baseball joint venture called "The Baseball Network." To a lesser extent, NBC also had a similar sort of revenue-sharing agreement with the Arena Football League and, because of their ownership in the XFL, also paid no rights fees for airing that league.

NBC's out-of-market games were available on NHL Center Ice through the 2006–07 season; NBC switched to stand-alone games for the 2007–08 season.

2004–05 NHL lockout
NBC's initial contract with the NHL ran for two years, with an option given to the network to renew for two additional years. NBC's NHL coverage was delayed a year because of the 2004–05 NHL lockout, which wound up cancelling the entire regular season and playoffs. NBC instead, decided to replace five of its scheduled NHL broadcasts with alternate sports programming (such as reruns of NASCAR Year in Review and The Purina Incredible Dog Challenge). NBC also decided to give one of the slots back to local affiliates, some of which filled the time given back to them with infomercials.

2004–05 schedule (all would have been regional games)

2005–06 season
NHL games officially returned to NBC under the new agreement on January 14, 2006, debuting with three regional games (New York Rangers at Detroit Red Wings, Colorado Avalanche at Philadelphia Flyers, which is aired on NBC Sports Philadelphia also followed by the Dallas Stars at Boston Bruins) to substantial praise among hockey fans and writers, who often compare the television network's presentation to Hockey Night in Canada, which is broadcast in full on the NHL Center Ice package (although some writers even speculated that NBC's playoff broadcasts were superior to CBC's, largely because of their choice of announcers and the fact that NBC provided HD coverage of games prior to the Finals).

Games 1 and 2 of the Stanley Cup Finals were on OLN, while the remainder of the series was on NBC. NBC's broadcast of Game 7 drew a 3.3 rating, a 21% drop from ABC's 4.2 for Game 7 in 2004. However, some NBC affiliates didn't air Game 7 live. Overall, NBC had an average rating of 2.3 for its five telecasts of the final, down 12% from ABC's 2004 average.

2005–06 schedule (all regional games)

2006–07 season
For the 2006–07 season, NBC broadcast three regional NHL games per weekend of coverage during the regular season. The network also scheduled ten coverage windows during the playoffs (not including the Stanley Cup Finals). The additional broadcasts were expected to replace the Arena Football League, which NBC dropped after the 2006 season. NBC also produced two games per week in high definition, up from one in 2005–06.

The newly titled NHL on NBC Game of the Week returned on January 13, 2007, with three regional games (between the Los Angeles and St. Louis Blues, Boston Bruins and New York Rangers, Pittsburgh Penguins and Philadelphia Flyers) at 2 p.m. Eastern Time. Games started at various times, ranging from 12:30 to 3:30 p.m. during the season (this variation primarily resulted from NBC's commitments to the PGA Tour and other programming).

2006–07 schedule (all regional games)
{| class="wikitable"
|Date
|Teams
|Start times (All times Eastern)
|Commentator crews
|-
|1/13/07
|Pittsburgh vs. PhiladelphiaBoston vs. New York RangersLos Angeles vs. St. Louis
|2 p.m.2 p.m.2 p.m.
|Mike Emrick, Eddie Olczyk, and Pierre McGuireDave Strader, Brian Hayward, and Joe MichelettiChris Cuthbert, Peter McNab, and Darren Pang
|-
|1/28/07
|Colorado vs. DetroitDallas vs. AnaheimPhiladelphia vs. Atlanta
|3:30 p.m.3:30 p.m.3:30 p.m.
|Mike Emrick, Eddie Olczyk, and Pierre McGuireDave Strader, Brian Hayward, and Joe MichelettiChris Cuthbert, Peter McNab, and Darren Pang
|-
|2/11/07
|Colorado vs. DallasTampa Bay vs. New JerseyChicago vs. Columbus
|3:30 p.m3:30 p.m.3:30 p.m.
|Mike Emrick, Eddie Olczyk, and Pierre McGuireDave Strader, Brian Hayward, and Joe MichelettiChris Cuthbert and Peter McNab
|-
|2/18/07
|Washington vs. PittsburghChicago vs. New York RangersSan Jose vs. Dallas
|3:30 p.m.3:30 p.m.3:30 p.m.
|Mike Emrick, Eddie Olczyk, and Pierre McGuireDave Strader, Peter McNab, and Joe MichelettiChris Cuthbert, Brian Hayward, and Darren Pang
|-
|3/4/07
|Colorado vs. DetroitPhiladelphia vs. Pittsburgh
|12:30 p.m.12:30 p.m.
|Mike Emrick, Eddie Olczyk, and Pierre McGuireDave Strader, Peter McNab, and Joe Micheletti|-
|3/11/07
|Boston vs. DetroitCarolina vs. New York Rangers
|12:30 p.m.12:30 p.m.
|Mike Emrick, Eddie Olczyk, and Pierre McGuireDave Strader, Brian Hayward, and Joe Micheletti|-
|3/25/07
|Boston vs. PittsburghNew York Rangers vs. New York Islanders
|12:30 p.m.12:30 p.m.
|Mike Emrick, Eddie Olczyk, and Pierre McGuireDave Strader, Brian Hayward, and Joe Micheletti|-
|4/1/07
|Detroit vs. ColumbusLos Angeles vs. San Jose
|12:30 p.m. (seen on all NBC stations in the Eastern, Central, and Mountain Time Zones)6 p.m. (West Coast, Alaska, and Hawaii)
|Mike Emrick, Eddie Olczyk, Brett Hull, and Pierre McGuireChris Cuthbert, Brian Hayward, and Peter McNab|-
|4/8/07
|Buffalo vs. PhiladelphiaChicago vs. Dallas
|1 p.m.1 p.m.
|Mike Emrick, Eddie Olczyk, and Pierre McGuireChris Cuthbert, Joe Micheletti, and Peter McNab|}

NBC moved its NHL telecasts to Sundays after its season premiere (which occurred on a Saturday) for the final eight dates of the season. The nine weeks of games (totaling 22 regional games) scheduled by the network amounted to the league's most extensive U.S. broadcast television coverage since , during Fox's tenure. A new Sunday Night Football-esque horizontal score banner, designed by Troika Design Group, also debuted during the season.

The 2007 Stanley Cup Final was also notable for its exceptionally poor television ratings in the United States. Games 1 and 2 were carried by cable channel Versus, then a new and little known player on the sports television scene. Game 1 produced a 0.5 national rating or 523,000 households. It was the 58th best rated program of that day. Game 2 produced a 0.4 national rating or 446,000 households, lower than the 2006 WNBA All-Star Game on ESPN which drew 447,000 households. It was the 74th best rated program of that day.

The move to NBC did little to compensate for the series' limited drawing power. A perennial last among the Big Four American television networks, NBC was at the time going through an intense period of ratings turmoil, setting lowest rated week records in several viewing categories over the course of Spring 2007.

Game 3's coverage on NBC garnered a mere 1.1 rating (approximately 1,205,600 households), making it the lowest rated prime-time broadcast in the network's history. For comparison, Game 6 of the NBA Eastern Conference Finals, broadcast opposite Game 3 on cable channel TNT, achieved a 5.3 rating, approximately 5,808,800 households. Game 4 achieved a 1.9 rating (approximately 2,082,400 households), down 5% from Game 4 the previous year. Game 5 received slightly less, 1.8 (approximately 1,972,800 households). As a whole, NBC's ratings for the championship series were down 20 percent from the previous season, making it the least watched final in the United States.

At the time, Versus was only available to 50% of cable-equipped homes in the Los Angeles area, which hurt the buzz around the Ducks' playoff run in a traditionally crowded sports and entertainment market. Versus was the fifth-most watched cable network in the Los Angeles market for Game 1, good only for a 1.7 local rating.

Local numbers did improve as the series moved to NBC. The Cup-clinching Game 5 drew a 6.0 and a 12 share for an average audience of 496,000 viewers in the Los Angeles market, twice larger than a high-profile regular season game between baseball's Los Angeles Dodgers and San Diego Padres on KCAL 9 (3.0/5, 218,000 viewers). This symbolic, if short-lived, victory against one of the region's flagship teams allowed the Ducks to close the series on a relatively high note, with the Los Angeles Times Larry Stewart calling their final ratings performance "pretty good".

2007 playoffs controversy
On May 19, 2007, during the Stanley Cup playoffs, NBC angered many fans and journalists when it pre-empted coverage of the overtime period of the tied Game 5 of the Eastern Conference Finals between the Ottawa Senators and Buffalo Sabres, instead going directly to pre-race coverage of the Preakness Stakes horse race. A typical "Triple Crown" horse racing broadcast generally contains about two hours of pre-race coverage, with the actual races lasting two or three minutes. Coverage of the overtime period was shifted to Versus, the league's cable partner, although viewers in Buffalo and Rochester were able to continue watching the game on local NBC affiliates in the respective markets, WGRZ and WHEC-TV.

The move was originally seen not only as a snub of small-market teams (such as the Sabres), but of hockey in general. However, NBC and the NHL later revealed that the Preakness deal had been made several years before and contained mandatory advertising commitments during the pre-race build-up. Both sides could have agreed that the entire game would air only on Versus or begin earlier in the day, but the NHL wanted at least one Eastern Conference Finals game to air on NBC and said that it does not schedule with the assumption that games will go into overtime. Moreover, an earlier start time could not be arranged because the broadcast window was fixed in advance, and both the NHL and NBC needed the flexibility to pick the Western Conference Finals for that window if they so desired.

In 2006, NBC televised Game 1 of the Eastern Conference Finals between the Sabres and the Carolina Hurricanes on the same day as the Preakness. Before the game, Bill Clement advised the audience that in the event that the game went into overtime, it would be televised on Versus, or OLN as it was known at the time. The Sabres won the game in regulation.

Pacific time, choosing to instead air its regular lineup of local newscasts and syndicated shows. KONG picked up the NBC telecasts of the games, and CBC Television's broadcasts of the games were available to most cable providers in the region through the network's Vancouver owned-and-operated station CBUT. For the 2007 and 2008 Stanley Cup Finals, however, KING-TV aired NBC's Saturday night telecasts, while KONG aired the other NBC telecasts. As for the 2009 Stanley Cup Finals, KING-TV aired Games 1, 2 and 5 while KONG aired Games 6 and 7.

NHL on NBC Faceoff
For the  season, NBC added an online, broadband-only pregame show to its NHL coverage (similar to what it does with its Notre Dame football coverage). Titled NHL on NBC Countdown to Faceoff, the show airs for a half-hour before every NHL on NBC telecast on NBCSports.com and features a breakdown of upcoming action, as well as reports from the game sites and a feature on an NHL player.

On March 27, 2007, NBC Sports and the NHL agreed to a one-year contract extension with a network option for a second year.

Through this method, the league selects at least three potential games at the start of the season for most of NBC's regular-season coverage dates. Thirteen days prior to the game, NBC then selects one to air as its Game of the Week, then the other two games move outside of NBC's broadcast window and return to teams' regional carriers. Since the league made network coverage a priority in the 1990s, regionalized coverage had been the norm; NBC is the first network to attempt to regularly present one game to the entire country. Additionally, studio segments began to originate from the game site instead of 30 Rockefeller Center. All game telecasts also began to be produced in 1080i high definition.

NBC began its 2007–08 schedule on January 1, 2008, with the NHL Winter Classic, an outdoor hockey game between the Buffalo Sabres and Pittsburgh Penguins at Ralph Wilson Stadium. The game went head-to-head with some of the New Year's Day college football bowl games, but none of the feature Bowl Championship Series games. While never expected to beat or directly compete with football ratings, the timing was designed to take advantage of the large audience flipping between channels to watch the different bowl games. It was the first such game to be televised live by an American network and the NHL's first outdoor regular season game since the Edmonton Oilers and Montreal Canadiens played the Heritage Classic, which aired on CBC, which served as the Canadian broadcaster of the 2008 Classic. Although originally maligned as a mere publicity stunt by some in the media, the 2008 Winter Classic drew a 2.6 rating in the U.S. (or about 2.9 million viewers) according to Nielsen, the highest rating for a regular-season contest since February 1996, when Fox was the league's network partner. By comparison, CBS received a 2.7 rating for the Gator Bowl, which also had a 1:00 p.m. start.

Beginning that season, all regular season telecasts air mainly on Sunday afternoons, except for those occurring the day after Thanksgiving and on New Year's Day.

In April 2008, NBC announced the activation of its option to retain broadcasting rights for the 2008–09 season. NBC's scheduling for that year was similar to that which it had during the 2007–08 season (flex scheduling for regular-season games, up to five games of the Stanley Cup Finals – changing in 2009 to include the first two and last three games, among others) except that all (or nearly all) of the Sunday-afternoon games now began at 12:30 p.m. Eastern Time. Coverage again included the Winter Classic outdoor game on January 1, 2009, between the Detroit Red Wings and the Chicago Blackhawks at Wrigley Field.

2008–09 season
NBC broadcast the first two and final three games of the Stanley Cup Final, while Versus broadcast Games 3 and 4. The first two games of the series were played on consecutive nights due to NBC's scheduling.

Game 7 was the final major sporting event on analog television in the United States, with the DTV transition finishing less than an hour-and-a-half after the game ended and just one hour after NBC coverage ended. NBC affiliates WDIV-TV in Detroit and WPXI in Pittsburgh – who months before the Stanley Cup playoffs began electing to keep their own respective analog signals on until June 12, well past the original February 17 deadline – both remained on the air for Game 7 before cutting their analog signals at 11:59 EDT.

Teams featured
Regular-season NHL telecasts on NBC itself usually only feature U.S.-based teams. During the Stanley Cup playoffs, broadcasting a game involving a Canadian team might be unavoidable. NBC has the first choice of games and times on its scheduled broadcast dates. The Canadian broadcasters (currently CBC and Sportsnet) are required to adjust accordingly during the playoffs, even though their rights fee is three times as high as NBC's.

There have been a few exceptions to this policy since 2006; in 2008, the Montreal Canadiens became the first Canadian team featured on the NHL on NBC during the regular season (NBC Sports' Dick Ebersol was rumored to have specifically wanted to do a game from Montreal at some point). The Canadiens played the New York Rangers on February 3. The 2014 NHL Winter Classic also featured a Canadian team, the Toronto Maple Leafs, up against the Detroit Red Wings at Michigan Stadium. Due to the revamp of the league's conferences and divisions that season, the cross-border rivalry had become an interdivisional one with the Wings' move to the Eastern Conference. The 2016 NHL Winter Classic had the Montreal Canadiens facing the Boston Bruins in Foxboro, Massachusetts. The Boston/Montreal rivalry is generally considered the fiercest in the NHL; in fact, there were rumblings that if Montreal were not Boston's opponent in the 2016 Classic that Boston would relinquish the game. NBCSN will occasionally feature Canadian teams during the regular season, but primarily only the Canadiens and the Maple Leafs, and only if they are playing a U.S.-based team.

Like its predecessors, NBC frequently chooses games with a focus on about six to eight teams: the New York Rangers, the Detroit Red Wings, the Pittsburgh Penguins, the Philadelphia Flyers, the Boston Bruins, and the Chicago Blackhawks; and most recently the Los Angeles Kings, the Vegas Golden Knights, and the Washington Capitals. Those teams received one and two potential games respectively in the 2008 season, compared to the seven potential games given to the Rangers and the four games which could include the Flyers. (Buffalo has fared better in its number of NBCSN appearances, due in part to the channel's relatively high viewership in the Buffalo market; it was noted in 2018 that their appearances on that network were in decline.)

The most frequently cited reasons for this relative lack of diversity are low ratings in a market (such as for the Anaheim Ducks, the New York Islanders, and the New Jersey Devils, which share markets with an Original Six team or a 1967 expansion team), market size (such as for Buffalo, where hockey ratings are the highest of any U.S. team, but the market itself is the smallest of any American NHL team), and Comcast's common ownership of both the Flyers and NBC, allowing the network to self-deal and cross-promote the Flyers on national television.

Examples of the above trends could be found in NBC Sports' national schedule for the 2015-16 regular season. In a press release announcing this schedule, NBC stated all U.S. teams would make at least one appearance on NBC or NBCSN during the regular season, but hockey writer Greg Wyshynski noted that:
 The Chicago Blackhawks (21), Pittsburgh Penguins and Philadelphia Flyers (tied at 18), Detroit Red Wings (16), and New York Rangers (13) made the most appearances on the schedule. The Flyers were tied for second despite missing the playoffs during the previous season.
 Five U.S. teams (the Arizona Coyotes, Carolina Hurricanes, Columbus Blue Jackets, Florida Panthers, and New Jersey Devils) only made 1 appearance each, while the Montreal Canadiens made 6 total appearances.
 The Anaheim Ducks, who advanced to the conference finals during the previous season, only made 4 appearances, while the Los Angeles Kings and the San Jose Sharks, who both missed the playoffs, appeared 10 and 11 times, respectively.
 The only Canadian teams to be scheduled were the Edmonton Oilers (despite drafting top prospect Connor McDavid with the first pick in the 2015 NHL Entry Draft) and Toronto Maple Leafs (despite having hired long-time Detroit Red Wings head coach Mike Babcock), both with one appearance each. The four remaining teams, who did each advance to the playoffs during the previous season, did not appear.

For the 2018–19 season, NBCSN announced that it would re-brand its Wednesday Night Rivalry broadcasts as Wednesday Night Hockey, with a larger focus on showcasing star players rather than league rivalries. With these changes, the network promoted that its schedule would feature a wider variety of teams, including games between Canadian teams. The October 24, 2018 game between the Toronto Maple Leafs and Winnipeg Jets marked the first time that NBC had ever originated its own telecast of a regular season game between Canadian opponents.

Innovations
Some of the innovations that NBC brought for its NHL telecasts included putting a star clock underneath the scoreboard at the top of the screen. During each game, NBC took one player from each team and clocks how long that player is out on the ice each time he comes out for a shift. In addition, goalies like Vegas’ Marc-André Fleury may have worn cameras inside their masks, much like Fox asked catchers to do for its Major League Baseball game broadcasts.

NBC also put one of their game color commentators (e.g. Pierre McGuire or Brian Boucher) in-between the two teams' benches, for what it called "Inside the Glass" reporting, which was later emulated by sister network NBC Sports Regional Networks, and TSN. This was contrary to traditional broadcasts, such as Hockey Night in Canada, which continued to have the play-by-play and color commentator in the broadcast booth, with the rinkside reporter that provided no analysis during the game. In addition to providing color commentary, this allowed the "Inside the Glass" reporter to observe and report on the benches, interviewing the coaches periodically, and providing the HONDA Starting Goalies before the game began.

2010s
NBC renewed its rights to the NHL for the 2010-11 season. The network broadcast schedule continued to include the Winter Classic, Sunday-afternoon games at 12:30 p.m. Eastern Time, six weekends of playoff action, and broadcasts of all but two games of the Stanley Cup Finals (which would be aired on NBCSN, NBC cable sports channel).

On February 20, 2011, NBC introduced Hockey Day in America – patterned after the CBC's Hockey Day in Canada, it featured eight of the most popular American teams in regional games: the Washington Capitals at the Buffalo Sabres, the Philadelphia Flyers at the New York Rangers, and the Detroit Red Wings at the Minnesota Wild, followed by the Pittsburgh Penguins at the Chicago Blackhawks for the national nightcap. The Flyers-Rangers game was aired in the majority of the country, while the Sabres-Capitals game was only seen in the Buffalo and Washington, D.C. markets; as was the Red Wings-Wild game in their respective markets. The tripleheader would be completed with the 2011 Heritage Classic, for which viewers were redirected to Versus.

2011–21 contract
On April 19, 2011, after ESPN, Turner Sports, and Fox Sports placed bids, NBC Sports announced it had reached a ten-year extension to its television contract with the NHL (through the 2020–21 season) worth nearly $2 billion over the tenure of the contract. The contract would cover games on both NBC and Versus; the channel had become a sister network to NBC via Comcast's acquisition of NBC Universal, and was to imminently be rebranded under the NBC Sports name. The channel would eventually rebrand as NBC Sports Network (NBCSN) in January 2012. Beginning in the 2011–12 season, the NHL on Versus branding was dropped in preparation for the channel's rebranding as NBCSN, with its broadcasts now carrying the NHL on NBC branding and production.

The terms of the deal included:
 A rights fee of roughly US$200 million per year for the combined cable and broadcast rights, nearly triple that of the previous contract;
 Increased weekly regular season coverage on NBCSN (as many as 90 games per season on Monday, Tuesday, and Wednesday nights), with Sunday night games also being added by the channel later in the season.
 Rights to an annual "Thanksgiving Showdown" game airing on NBC the day after Thanksgiving ("Black Friday" afternoon) (the 2012 edition was cancelled due to the 2012–13 NHL lockout). The November broadcast is the earliest an NHL regular season game has aired on a broadcast television network in the U.S. since the 1950s, when the league still only had six teams. The 2013 "Thanksgiving Showdown" game featured the Boston Bruins hosting the New York Rangers; it was widely expected that Boston will remain the home team in future years and launch a holiday tradition for the league and network (Boston has hosted matinee games the day after Thanksgiving since the 1980s), much like Detroit and Dallas traditionally host National Football League games on Thanksgiving Day; however, NBC decided to end this tradition for the 2014–15 season, with a Black Friday matinee between the Philadelphia Flyers and New York Rangers being aired instead, while Boston held a locally televised game on the evening of Black Friday in 2014. Boston resumed hosting the game in 2015, with a second Black Friday game (Chicago at Anaheim) airing later in the afternoon on NBCSN.
 Continued coverage on NBC of the Bridgestone NHL Winter Classic to be played on New Year's Day unless that day lands on a Sunday, in which case the game is moved to January 2 (despite the open time slot on Sunday afternoons, NBC is effectively forbidden via a gentleman's agreement with the NFL which prevents any form of strong counterprogramming against NFL games televised on CBS and Fox). Initially the Classic was expected to be played in primetime, however to date every game has been scheduled for a 1 PM ET start, and due to new competition from the College Football Playoff the game is now expected to remain a daytime game for the foreseeable future. NBC has instead opted to air one prime time game each year, later in the season, since 2014.
 A national "Game of the Week" continuing on NBC as in previous years, beginning each January (January is the start month due to NBC's contract with the NFL).
 Hockey Day in America becoming a permanent annual part of the NBC schedule.
 Rights to any future Heritage Classics, which would be aired on NBCSN.
 Digital rights across all platforms for any games broadcast by NBC or NBCSN.
 Increased coverage of Stanley Cup Playoff games, with all playoff games airing nationally on NBC, NBCSN, CNBC, USA, and NHL Network. (MSNBC and even Golf Channel were once previously used for Stanley Cup playoff games.) Local sports networks carried their teams' first-round games, but any games on NBC in the first round, and any games from all rounds thereafter, were exclusive to NBC.
 Continued sharing of the Stanley Cup Finals on NBCSN, which aired Games 2 & 3; and NBC for everything else, plus the if-needed games.
NHL regular season games on NBC were exclusive to the network. While some NHL games on NBCSN are exclusive (such as Wednesday Night Hockey), other games carried by the network may be blacked out regionally in favor of television stations or regional sports networks which hold the local broadcast rights to an NHL franchise. Among the games normally blacked out from NBCSN include teams that are carried by their respective NBC Sports Regional Networks, as well as the Boston Bruins (NESN), Detroit Red Wings (Fox Sports Detroit), New York Rangers (MSG), Pittsburgh Penguins (AT&T SportsNet Pittsburgh) and St. Louis Blues (Fox Sports Midwest).

As mentioned earlier, NBC Sports Regional broadcasts are occasionally simulcast on the NBC networks. This also applied during the first round of the Stanley Cup playoffs. Games featuring Canadian teams sometimes used a simulcast of either CBC or Sportsnet (and previously TSN).

In the 2012–13 season, Wednesday night games on NBCSN were rebranded as Wednesday Night Rivalry, primarily featuring rivalry games. For the 2013–14 season, NBC Sports introduced the series NHL Rivals, which looks back at the participating teams' historic rivalry leading up to the featured Wednesday Night Rivalry game.

Beginning in the 2014–15 season, TSN Hockey personalities Bob McKenzie, Darren Dreger and Chris Cuthbert joined the NHL on NBC team. This was the result of Rogers Media's – the owners of Sportsnet – exclusive 12-year deal with the NHL in Canada replacing both TSN and CBC Sports as the rightsholders to the NHL.

In 2014, NBC Sports partnered with Electronic Arts to integrate NHL on NBC presentation into its NHL video game series, beginning with NHL 15. Complementing the change, Mike Emrick and Eddie Olczyk also voiced commentary and other appearances in the game. The score bug can be switched to a transparent view in order for players to be shown at the top of the screen, if necessary. This would continue up into NHL 19, in which it would be replaced with the generic graphic package, starting with NHL 20.

In 2015, NBC Sports partnered with the league to expand Kraft Hockeyville into the United States. The annual contest, in which communities compete to demonstrate their commitment to ice hockey, with the winning community being awarded the opportunity to host a nationally televised NHL preseason game, was first held across Canada in 2006. Similar to what CBC Sports had done in covering Kraft Hockeyville in Canada, NBC Sports began airing regular segments on the separate Hockeyville USA competition for communities in the U.S. On September 29, 2015, NBCSN aired the inaugural Kraft Hockeyville USA game at Cambria County War Memorial Arena, Johnstown, Pennsylvania, marking the first time that the NHL on NBC televised a preseason game since it acquired the American rights in 2005.

During the 2015–16 season, exclusive Sunday night games on NBCSN were rebranded as Sunday Night Hockey, with the first game under the new brand taking place on January 10, 2016, between the New Jersey Devils and the Minnesota Wild. A weekly recap show, NHL Sunday Shootout, premiered on the same day. NBC also began to air select Game of the Week and Sunday Night Hockey broadcasts under the Star Sunday banner starting with the 2016–17 season, devoting special coverage to the game's featured players of the week.

Starting in the 2016–17 season, NBC began to use its regional networks (then primarily-branded as Comcast SportsNet) to originate coverage of games involving teams whose regional rights are owned by an NBC (in this case, Chicago Blackhawks, Philadelphia Flyers, San Jose Sharks, and Washington Capitals). These broadcasts used the video footage from the regional broadcaster, overlaid with national commentators. In the 2017 playoffs, NBC used its regional networks for games involving Chicago, San Jose, and Washington.

At the start of the 2018–19 season, NBC gradually phased Pierre McGuire out of the lead broadcast team in favor of Brian Boucher on the lead broadcast team. McGuire, however, was still assigned to work with the lead team of Mike Emrick and Eddie Olczyk on select Wednesday Night Hockey, Game of the Week broadcasts, and the 2019 Stanley Cup Finals. However, as of the start of the 2019–20 season, Boucher now works with the lead team while McGuire continues to appear on other broadcasts. In addition, NBC began using U.S. women's ice hockey stars A. J. Mleczko and Kendall Coyne Schofield as game analysts on select broadcasts, and NBC even assigned Mike Tirico to call play-by-play on a few broadcasts.

During the 2019–20 season, NBCSN flexed in several Washington Capitals games in February in anticipation of Alexander Ovechkin's 700th NHL goal. Those games used the NBC Sports Washington feed and announcers. In one instance, the February 10 broadcast involving the Capitals and New York Islanders aired nationally on NBCSN (blacked out in the team's local markets) at the expense of its originally-scheduled game between the Tampa Bay Lightning and Columbus Blue Jackets, which only aired on the team's local markets. In the end, however, NBCSN missed out on covering Ovechkin's 700th goal (which took place on Saturday afternoon, February 22, against the New Jersey Devils), due to a prior commitment with the 2020 Guinness Six Nations Rugby Championship. NHL Network aired the game instead.

On February 16, 2020, NBC announced that it had assigned an all-female crew to call the Blues–Blackhawks game on March 8 in Chicago in honor of International Women's Day. The game featured Kate Scott on play-by-play, A. J. Mleczko as booth analyst and Kendall Coyne Schofield as "Inside the Glass" analyst. Kathryn Tappen and Jennifer Botterill were tapped to work the game in the studio.

Stanley Cup Finals coverage
In 2014, NBCSN broadcast Games 3 and 4, while NBC televised the remaining games. NBC Sports originally planned to repeat its coverage pattern from the last few seasons: NBCSN would televise Game 2 and 3, while NBC would broadcast Game 1, and then Games 4 and 5. After the League scheduled Game 2 on the day of the Belmont Stakes, coverage of Games 2 and 4 were switched so NBC's telecast of the horse race would serve as lead-in programming to game two. Due to the death of a family member, NBC's lead play-by-play announcer Mike Emrick missed Game 1. Kenny Albert, who was also the New York Rangers radio announcer for WEPN and announced several national games (including the Western Conference Finals) for NBC/NBCSN, filled in for Emrick in the first game.

It was originally announced that Games 2 and 3 of the 2015 Finals were to be broadcast by NBCSN, with the remainder on NBC. Game 2 was moved to NBC to serve as a lead-out for its coverage of the 2015 Belmont Stakes in favor of Game 4 on NBCSN. As Eddie Olczyk was also a contributor to NBC's Belmont coverage, he was absent during Game 2.

On May 27, 2016, NBC Sports announced that if the Finals was tied at 1-1 entering Game 3, then it would have aired on NBC and Game 4 televised on NBCSN. However, if one team led 2-0 (as this eventually happened), Game 3 moved to NBCSN and then Game 4 on NBC.

By the end of NBC's run with the NHL in 2021, no matter the circumstance of the series, while NBCSN aired two of the first three games, NBC aired everything else, which included all the if-needed ones so that every potentially clinching game of the championship series would be on broadcast television.

NBC Sports Radio
On Tuesday, May 3, 2016, NBC Sports Radio was granted rights to broadcast and syndicate the 2016 Stanley Cup Finals. Kenny Albert will provide the play-by-play while Joe Micheletti will serve as color commentator. This was the first neutral national broadcast since the 2008 NHL Radio broadcast.

2018 Winter Olympics
The NHL refused to allow players to compete at the 2018 Winter Olympics ice hockey tournament. Initially, in response to the NHL's decision, NBC elected not to air any NHL games during the three-week period on either the NBC broadcast network or NBCSN. However, NBC later relented and added three Sunday afternoon games in February as a lead-in to the Winter Olympics.

2020s
On October 19, 2020, NBC's lead play-by-play announcer Mike Emrick announced his retirement from broadcasting. Emirck's final assignment for NBC was his call of Game 6 of the 2020 Stanley Cup Finals. As he had been doing throughout the 2020 playoffs, the 74 year old Emrick called the Cup Finals off of monitors from his home studio in Metro Detroit, citing his advanced age as a potential risk for severe illness from COVID-19. Following Emrick's retirement, NBC did not name a presumptive lead play-by-play voice. Instead, they chose to rotate between John Forslund and Kenny Albert on the no. 1 team. On January 18, NBCSN aired a day-night quadruple-header on Martin Luther King Jr. Day, featuring Columbus at Detroit, Boston at New York Islanders, Buffalo at Philadelphia and Arizona at Vegas.

On the weekend of February 20–21, 2021, the NHL held two contests outdoors at Lake Tahoe. Coverage of the Saturday game between the Vegas Golden Knights and the Colorado Avalanche began on NBC. Play was suspended after the first period due to ice conditions caused by its exposure to heat and sunlight; the game was resumed at 9:02 p.m. PT (12:02 a.m. ET). It was moved to NBCSN due to the delay. As a result of the Sunday game between the Philadelphia Flyers and Boston Bruins being moved to a 7:30 p.m. ET start time, it too was moved from NBC to NBCSN (with an evening game between the New Jersey Devils and Washington Capitals swapped into NBC's afternoon window as a replacement). Mike Tirico provided the play-by-play commentary alongside Eddie Olczyk (analyst) and Brian Boucher (‘Inside-the-Glass’ reporter). Rutledge Wood meanwhile, served as an on-site reporter in Lake Tahoe.

The end of The NHL on NBC
On January 22, 2021, an internal memo sent by NBC Sports president Pete Bevacqua announced that NBCSN would cease operations by the end of the year, and that USA Network would begin "carrying and/or simulcasting certain NBC Sports programming," including the Stanley Cup Playoffs and NASCAR races, before NBCSN's shutdown. Peacock, NBCUniversal's new streaming service, will also carry some of the network's former programming starting in 2022. The move was cited by industry analysts as a response to the impact of the COVID-19 pandemic on the sports and television industries, the acceleration of cord-cutting, as well as formidable competition from rival sports networks such as ESPN and Fox Sports 1.

With the NBC Sports contract expiring at the end of the 2020–21 season, the league has explored the possibility of splitting its U.S. national media rights between multiple broadcasters, and over-the-top services (such as DAZN, ESPN+, or NBC's Peacock). In any case, the league aimed to surpass the US$2 billion total that NBC paid over the life of their 2011–12 to 2020–21 contract. On March 10, 2021, the NHL announced that ESPN would serve as one of the new rightsholders under a seven-year contract, which will include packages of regular season games for ESPN and ABC (including opening night, the All-Star Game, and other special events), 75 original telecasts and all out-of-market games on ESPN+, rights to half of the Stanley Cup playoffs (including one conference final per-season), and four Stanley Cup Finals over the length of the contract.

On April 26, 2021, Sports Business Journal reported that NBC had officially pulled out of bidding for future NHL rights, meaning that NBC will not televise NHL games for the first time since the 2004–05 NHL lockout. The next day, Turner Sports announced that they had agreed to a seven-year deal with the NHL to broadcast at least 72 games nationally on TNT and TBS (while also giving HBO Max the live streaming and simulcast rights to these games) beginning with the 2021–22 season, which will include three Stanley Cup Finals, the other half of the Stanley Cup playoffs, and the Winter Classic.

Analysts believed that once ESPN obtained not only more Stanley Cup Finals (four out of three) than NBC desired but overall hockey content, it wasn't worth spending more money on a smaller package in contrast to what they were last paying the NHL. To put things into proper perspective, the secondary package that Turner Sports gained, was reportedly worth $225 million per year. NBCUniversal was at the time, paying the NHL roughly $300 million a year for exclusive rights fees. Combined with the approximately $400 million per year that the NHL was expected to receive from ESPN, the new rights fees were expected to be worth more than $625 million.

Ultimately, NBC's final NHL broadcast was Game 5 of the 2021 Stanley Cup Finals at Amalie Arena on July 7. There, the Tampa Bay Lightning defeated the Montreal Canadiens by a score of 1–0 to win their second consecutive Stanley Cup.

After the end of the subsequent postgame coverage on NBCSN, the network aired a 13-minute video montage, narrated by long-time lead play-by-play voice Mike Emrick (who had taken the role as a contributor in the final NHL on NBC'' season), discussing various innovations that NBC had brought to their NHL coverage over the past 15 seasons, highlights, and human interest stories that had occurred along the way as well. At the end of the video, Emrick signed off for NBC's coverage with the following:

Eddie Olczyk missed Game 2 of the 2021 Stanley Cup Finals due to a personal matter, so "Inside-the-Glass" reporter Brian Boucher moved to the booth with Albert, and Pierre McGuire took over for Boucher between the benches. McGuire also called Game 3 of this series with Albert and Olczyk because Boucher missed it due to the same matter.

In all, NBC averaged 2.52 million viewers for the 2021 Stanley Cup Finals. The fifth and ultimately decisive game meanwhile, garnered approximately 3.6 million viewers for NBC.

Aftermath
Following the conclusion of the 2021 Stanley Cup Finals, Kenny Albert and Eddie Olczyk moved over to Turner Sports to serve as their lead broadcast team. Also moving over from NBC to Turner Sports were studio host Liam McHugh and studio analysts Anson Carter and Keith Jones.

"Inside the Glass" reporter Pierre McGuire meanwhile, was hired by the Ottawa Senators to serve as the team's senior vice-president of player development on July 12, 2021. Secondary play–by–play announcer John Forslund moved on to become the television play-by-play broadcaster on Root Sports Northwest for the Seattle Kraken ahead of their inaugural NHL season in fall 2021. Forslund later joined TNT in a fill-in role.

"Inside the Glass" reporter and studio analyst Brian Boucher joined ESPN/ABC for its NHL coverage as a lead color commentator alongside Ray Ferraro.

On-air staff

Commentators

Ratings

NHL coverage on NBC owned-and-operated television stations

NBC Sports Regional Networks

References

External links
 
 
 Hey, Here’s Five Unsolicited Suggestions For NBC’s Hockey Coverage
 Luring Stanley Cup Viewers With a Torrent of Games

 
NBC original programming
NBCSN shows
1966 American television series debuts
1966 American television series endings
1972 American television series debuts
1975 American television series endings
1990 American television series debuts
1994 American television series endings
2006 American television series debuts
2021 American television series endings
2010s American television series
2020s American television series
NBC Sports Radio programming
Sports telecast series
American television series revived after cancellation